Valea Rusului may refer to:

Valea Rusului, a village in Pruteni Commune, Făleşti district, Moldova
Valea Rusului, a village in Lupșanu Commune, Călăraşi County, Romania